The Type 053 is a family of Chinese frigates that served with the People's Liberation Army Navy Surface Force, and a small number of foreign navies.

Nomenclature for Chinese warships was temporarily changed during the Cultural Revolution, and some subclasses gained different NATO reporting names.

Nomenclature
The naming of the Type 053/Type 6601/Type 065 frigates reflected contemporary Chinese political turmoil. The PLAN originally named major surface combatants after geographical areas in China, but this practice was abolished during the Cultural Revolution. During that period, most of the third batch of Type 065s were either not named or had their names stripped; ships were referred to only by their hull numbers.

The naming of ships resumed in the latter half of the 1980s. However, by that time the Type 065s were nearing retirement, and the traditional geographic names were given to newer ships. For example, Jinan was allocated to a Type 051 destroyer. When the older Type 053/Type 6601/Type 065 were renamed, none received the same one they had held before.

History

Replicating the Riga and the Type 065
In the 1950s, the Soviets provided China with four kits for Riga-class frigates and four completed Gnevny-class destroyers. These entered PLAN service as the Type 01 Chengdu class and the Type 07 Anshan class, respectively. The Riga kits were assembled by the Huangpu Shipyard in Guangzhou, and the Hudong Shipyard in Shanghai, from 1955 to 1958. These ships formed the PLAN's backbone in the 1950s and 1960s.

Following the Sino-Soviet split and the withdrawal of Soviet aid, the Wuhan-based No. 701 Institute began reverse-engineering the Type 01 in 1962. The result was the Type 065. It was based on the Riga class hull, with the flush deck replaced by a long forecastle. This modification was needed to accommodate a large medium-speed diesel powerplant; the civilian diesel was a substitute for the Riga class' compact high-pressure steam turbine powerplant that the Chinese were unable to replicate. The first Type 065, Haikou (529), was laid down at Huangpu in August 1964 and commissioned by August 1966.

Type 053K air-defence frigate
From 1965 to 1967, the No. 701 Institute designed the Type 053K (Kong for air-defence), an air-defence variant of the Type 065. This met a PLAN requirement for air-defence ships to accompany the surface-warfare Type 051 destroyers. The Type 053K was originally intended to have three screws powered by a combined gas-turbine and diesel engine, with a speed of 38 knots. However, technical constraints forced the Chinese to settle for a diesel engine, powering two screws for a maximum speed of 30 knots.

The Type 053Ks were armed with HQ-61 surface-to-air missiles, launched from two twin-armed launchers; these did not enter service until the mid-1980s. The 100 mm. gun armament was also delayed. This class received NATO reporting name as Jiangdong class.

Only two Type 053Ks were completed, possibly due to unsatisfactory performance and the long development time for their intended armament. Yingtan (531) was laid down in 1970 and commissioned in 1977, and followed by Zhongdong (532). Both ships were withdrawn from service in 1992, with one scrapped in 1994 and the other preserved as a museum ship.

Type 053H surface-warfare frigate

The PLAN retired many older frigates in the 1970s, and the No. 701 Institute developed the Type 053H (Hai for anti-ship) as a replacement. The initial design was armed with four SY-1 anti-ship missiles in two twin-missile box launchers, two single 100 mm. guns, six twin 37mm guns, depth charges and short-range ASW rockets. The Type 053H received the NATO codename Jianghu-I. The first was constructed by the Hudong Shipyard and entered service in the mid-1970s. At least a dozen were built and entered service with the PLAN East Sea Fleet.

The Type 053H was improved in four successive subclasses, receiving NATO codenames Jianghu-II through Jianghu-V. The Type 053Hs were succeeded by the PLAN's first multirole frigates, the Type 053H2G and Type 053H3 frigates.

Type 053H2 surface-warfare frigate
The Type 053H2, NATO codename Jianghu-III, is an improved version of Type 053H1 frigates. Hudong Shipyard built seven hulls for the People's Liberation Army Navy (three ships) and Royal Thai Navy  (four ships) between 1985 and 1992. In 2013,two of PLAN Type 053H2 frigates were transferred to Bangladesh Navy. Basically, Type 053H2 is an anti-surface warfare (ASuW) frigate for the littoral environment featuring a sophisticated combat management system and enhanced electronic warfare and countermeasures capabilities.

Foreign sales

The Chinese sold the Type 053H, and derivatives to foreign navies.
One refurbished Type 053H1 and two Type 053H2 was sold to the Bangladesh Navy, with two refurbished Type 053Hs going to the Egyptian Navy. Sonars for these ships are Echo Type 5, a development of EH-5 sonar used on Jianghu-III's, adopting LSIC technology. PLAN also added Type 343 fire control radar for gun. They mounted Silkworm anti-ship missiles.

The Royal Thai Navy received four new Type 053HTs (based on the then-latest Type 053H2) in the early-1990s. Each cost ฿2 billion. Two were modified with rear helicopter decks. The sonar on these ships is SJD-5A, a further development of Echo Type 5 sonars on the same class of ships sold to Egyptian and Bangladesh navies, with VLSIC replacing LSIC.

By the mid-1990s, the Thai Navy again ordered two enlarged Type 053 hulls as the F25T Naresuan-class frigates. The general designer of F25T frigate is Mr. Zhu Yingfu (朱英富). The F25Ts were fitted with Western engines and armament, and their construction was supervised by technical advisers from the German ship building industry. Sonars on these F25Ts are SO-7H, which is the Chinese version of French DUBA25.

Transfers to the Coast Guard
In 2007, the Type 053H frigates "509" and "510" were transferred to the China Coast Guard and refitted as Ocean Patrol Vehicles "1002" and "1003". The superstructure was heavily modified. Armament was reduced to a small cannon forward and heavy machine guns; some of freed space was used to stow small patrol boats and add crew quarters.

Transfers to Bangladesh Navy
One used Type 053H1 frigate was sold to the Bangladesh Navy as BNS Osman in 1989. She was the first guided missile frigate to enter in service with the Bangladesh Navy. In 2013, two Type 053H2 frigates were transferred to Bangladesh Navy as BNS Abu Bakr and BNS Ali Haider respectively.

Transfers to Myanmar 

In 2012, two Type 053H1 frigates, Anshun (FFG 554) and Jishou (FFG 557) were transferred to Myanmar Navy as UMS Mahar Bandoola (F-21) and UMS Mahar Thiha Thura (F-23) respectively.

Incidents
On 11 July 2012, a Jianghu-V ship, Dongguan (560), ran aground on a shoal off the coast of the Philippines. The area where the incident occurred, known as Half Moon Shoal (Hasa Hasa Shoal in the Philippines) in the Spratly Islands is 60 miles west of Rizal, Palawan. By 15 July the ship had been refloated and was returning to port with no casualty and only minor damage. Confrontations over territorial disputes in the South China Sea, and particularly the disputed status of the Spratly Islands, have become more frequent in recent years, and caused noticeable friction at the 2012 ASEAN summit in Phnom Penh that was taking place at the same time as the incident.

Versions

 Type 6601 (Chengdu class)
Completed as Riga-class frigates. Slightly more heavily armed than the Soviet Riga class (Project 50) it is based on in that the two twin 25 mm gun mounts on original Riga class are replaced by a second pair of twin 37 mm gun mounts in Chengdu class. In addition, the original RBU-2500 ASW launchers on the original Riga class is replaced by RBU-1200 on Type 6601. All units were converted to Type 01 in the early 1970s.

 Type 01 (Chengdu class)
By the early 1970s, Type 6601 class went through mid-life upgrade with their torpedo tubes replaced by a twin launcher for SY-1 anti-ship missiles. Although redesignated as Type 01, these ships were still called Chengdu class.  Retired in the 1980s.

 Type 065 (NATO codename Jiangnan)

Based on the Type 6601/01. design first started in Dec 1962 by the 701st Institute at Wuhan, and the construction begun in Aug 1964, with the first ship entering service on Aug 1, 1966.  Powered by modified civilian diesel engine rather than military-grade steam turbines. Main guns were mounted one forward and two aft, instead of two forward and one aft on the Riga class. Completely withdrawn from active duty in the 1980s, but remained as training, museum, and public relations ships. The ships remain on the PLAN's roster, and their upkeep at museums is provided by the PLAN.

 Type 053K (NATO codename Jiangdong)

Air-defense frigate armed with two twin-armed HQ-61 surface-to-air missile (SAM) launchers. Only two built, and retired from active service in the early 1990s. Yingtan (531) is docked at a museum in Qingdao; the PLAN retains ownership and provides upkeep.

 Type 053H (NATO codename Jianghu-I)
"Mass production" surface warfare frigate whose design and equipment were hopelessly outdated before the first ship even completed.  The only nod to modernity was the four anti-ship SY-1s in two twin-box launchers. Remaining armament consisted to two single 100mm dual-purpose hand-loaded guns with fire control by a very simple stereoscopic rangefinder, limiting the guns to effective fire against surface targets in daylight/clear weather only.  The six twin 37mm short-range anti-aircraft guns were all locally controlled, severely limiting their effectiveness.  These ships are equipped with Chinese SJD-3 sonar, which is modification of Soviet Tamir-11 (MG-11, with NATO reporting name Stag Hoof) hull mounted sonar:  instead of being fixed to the hull, SJD-3 has a telescoping arm, so when not in use, the sonar is stored in the hull, and when deployed, the sonar is lowered into water several meter below the hull, thus increased detection range by avoiding baffles generated by the hull.11 Anti-submarine armament was limited to short-range rockets and depth charges.  Damage control arrangements were minimal. All decommissioned except one reserved as an experiment platform.

 Type 053H1 (NATO codename Jianghu-II)

Improved Type 053H with newer electronics, engine, and replenishment equipment. The sonar for Jianghu-II is SJD-5, which is a Chinese development of Soviet Tamir-11 (MG-11), (NATO reporting name Stag Hoof), with transistors replacing vacuum tubes in the original Soviet MG-11. Armed with six SY-2 in two triple-box launchers.

Zhaotong (555) was modified with more advanced systems as a test bed. PL-9C SAMs were added to its 37mm AA gun mounts.

8 remained in service in 2007.

 Type 053H2 (NATO codename Jianghu-III)

Designed on an enlarged Type 053 hull, and displayed European influence. Considered the first "modern" Chinese frigate with airtight cabins, central air condition, NBC protection, and integrated combat system (British CTC-1629/Chinese ZKJ-3A). The sonar for Jianghu-III is EH-5, a development of earlier SJD-5 used on Jianghu-II, with integrated circuits replacing transistors. Armed with two four-box missile launchers, carrying YJ-8 or YJ-82 surface-to-surface missiles (SSM), and four Type 79A 100mm guns in two two-gun turrets. Three were in service with the East Sea Fleet in 1997.

 Type 053H1Q (NATO codename Jianghu-IV)
Modified Type 053H with aft weapons replaced with a helicopter deck for Harbin Z-9 helicopter. Armed with one SY-1 SSM dual-box launcher, and a compact French-made 100mm gun. Only one ship was built; Siping (544) served with the North Sea Fleet. This ship was renamed as Lushun in July 2010, and later transferred to Chinese Naval Academy to serve as a training ship.

 Type 053H1G (NATO codename Jianghu-V)
[[File:053H1G-559.jpg|thumb|Type 053H1G frigate Foshan]]
Originally an economy class based on the Type 053H1. Six built by the Guangzhou-based Huangpu Shipyard in the 1990s to meet an urgent need for ships by the South Sea Fleet. Incorporated improvements from the Type 053H2, including air-tight cabins, central air conditioning, NBC protection, and integrated combat system. The sonar for Jianghu-V is EH-5A, the latest variant of SJD-5/EH-5/Echo Type 5 family, and it's a highly digitized version. Initially armed with six obsolescent SY-1A in two tripled-box launchers, later upgraded to eight YJ-83 SSM in two four-box launchers.

 Type 053H2G (NATO codename Jiangwei-I)

 Type 053H3 (NATO codename Jiangwei-II)

 'Naresuan class'General characteristics

Ships

 Type 053K (Jiangdong) Ships of Class 

 Type 053H (Jianghu-I) Ships of Class 

 Type 053H1 (Jianghu-II) Ships of Class 

 Type 053H1Q (Jianghu-IV) Ships of Class 

 Type 053H2 (Jianghu-III) Ships of Class 

 Type 053H1G (Jianghu-V) Ships of Class 

 Service with other navies 
11 total:
 Bangladesh Navy 
 BNS Osman (F18) (Type 053H1): ex-PLAN Xiangtan (556), sold to Bangladesh in 1989. Decommissioned in 2020.
 BNS Abu Bakr (F15) (Type 053H2): ex-PLAN Huangshi (535), sold to Bangladesh in 2013.
 BNS Ali Haider (F17) (Type 053H2): ex-PLAN Wuhu (536), sold to Bangladesh in 2013.
 Myanmar Navy
 UMS Maha Bandula (F21) (Type 053H1): ex-PLAN Anshun (554), sold to Burma in 2012.
 UMS Maha Thiha Thura (F23) (Type 053H1): ex-PLAN Jishou (557), sold to Burma in 2012.
 Egyptian Navy  
 ENS Najim al-Zafir (951) (Type 053HE): Decommissioned.
 ENS Al-Nasser (956) (Type 053HE): Decommissioned.
 Royal Thai Navy 
 HTMS Chao Phraya (455) (Type 053HT):  Based on the Type 053H2 (Jianghu-III), built for export in 1991 as 053T (T = Thailand).
 HTMS Bangpakong (456) (Type 053HT):  Same as above
 HTMS Kraburi (457) (Type 053HT(H)):  Improved 053HT-H design, built in 1992 for export.  Helicopter deck + YJ-81 (C-801) SSM's.
 HTMS Saiburi (458) (Type 053HT(H)):  Same as above.

Coast Guard ship class

Two Type 053H are now classed as coast guard cutters following transfer and modifications:

 Changde (509) - now Haijing 1002 Shaoxing (510) - now Haijing 1003''

See also
 List of naval ship classes in service

References

Jackson, Robert "Fighting Ships of The World." London: Amber Books Ltd, 2004 Pg.383

External links

 Sino Defense Today

 
Frigates of the People's Liberation Army Navy
China–Soviet Union relations
China Coast Guard ships

cs:Fregata typu 053H2
pl:Fregaty rakietowe typu 053H